One on Romance is a 1913 American silent black and white romance comedy film directed by Edwin Middleton, written by Anita Bresman, produced by Siegmund Lubin and starring Jack Barrymore.

It's a lost film on a split reel, where two films are placed on the same reel. The films was produced by the Philadelphia-based Lubin Manufacturing Company and was lost in an explosion and fire at the Lubin vaults in 1914.

Cast
 Jack Barrymore as Jack Wilson
 Eleanor Caines as Helen Ross
 Frank DeVernon as Howard Ross - Helen's Father
 Charles Bartlett

See also
John Barrymore filmography

References

External links
 

American silent short films
American black-and-white films
American romantic comedy films
1910s romantic comedy films
Lubin Manufacturing Company films
General Film Company
Lost American films
Lost romantic comedy films
1913 lost films
1913 comedy films
1913 films
Films directed by Edwin Middleton
1910s American films
Silent romantic comedy films
Silent American comedy films